Mouse Trouble is a 1944 American one-reel animated cartoon short and is the 17th Tom and Jerry short produced by Fred Quimby. It was directed by William Hanna and Joseph Barbera, with music direction by Scott Bradley. The cartoon was animated by Ray Patterson, Irven Spence, Ken Muse and Pete Burness. Mouse Trouble won the 1944 Oscar for Best Animated Short Film, the second consecutive award bestowed upon the series. It was released in theatres on November 23, 1944 by Metro-Goldwyn Mayer and reissued on December 12, 1951.

Plot
After the postman puts a gift into Tom's mailbox, Tom opens the box and finds a book on how to catch mice (named How to Catch a Mouse and released by Random Mouse, a parody of Random House).

The first thing the book suggests is to locate the mouse. Tom finds Jerry reading the book with him, but when he tries to grab Jerry, the mouse steps off the book and slams Tom's nose in it.

Tom sets out a simple mousetrap. Jerry succeeds in freeing the cheese without setting the trap off. Surprised at the trap's failure, Tom tests it, and the trap snaps Tom's finger, which causes the cat to yell in pain. Tom then sets a snare trap around some cheese and gets ready to pull the string but is distracted by a bowl of cream substituted for the cheese by Jerry, who activates the trap, sending the cat out to the tree himself.

Practicing the "A Curious Mouse is Easy to Catch" chapter, Tom sits outside Jerry's mousehole reading the book and laughs hysterically at it but denies Jerry any chance to see it. When Jerry climbs onto the book to see it, Tom slams it shut on him. However, when Tom grabs him, Jerry pretends to look inside his fists to show Tom that something is in them, and when Tom looks, Jerry punches him in the eye. Enraged, Tom corners Jerry and, after reading the passage in the book Chapter V: "A Cornered Mouse NEVER FIGHTS," pounces on him, and the two engage in a violent brawl. Tom sticks his head around the corner, bruised and battered, and eerily says: "Don't you believe it!"

At this point, Tom stops reading chapter-to-chapter and just randomly goes through the book until he finds something he thinks will work. Upon reading Chapter VII: "Be scientific in your approach," Tom uses a stethoscope to listen for Jerry within the house's walls. This backfires when Jerry screams into the stethoscope, almost deafening Tom. Tom then forces a double-barreled shotgun into Jerry's mousehole. However, Jerry causes the barrels to protrude out of the wall and point straight at Tom's head as the cat fires, shooting him in the head and rendering him bald. In the next scene, Tom (now wearing a dodgy orange toupee for the remainder of this episode) sets a bear trap and slides it into the mousehole. Jerry walks outside from another hole behind Tom and puts the trap behind him, which triggers when Tom sits down and sends him flying into the ceiling. Tom then tries to use a mallet to flatten Jerry, but Jerry pops out of a hole behind a picture right above Tom, grabs the mallet, and hits him. After reading Chapter IX: "Slip him a surprise package," Tom attempts to disguise himself in a gift box. Jerry knocks on it, hearing no response. Inexplicably, Jerry impales the box with pins while Tom whimpers and groans in pain before sawing the box in half. Still hearing nothing, Jerry eagerly looks inside the box but just as quickly pulls his head out. Horror-stricken, he gulps and displays a sign reading "IS THERE A DOCTOR IN THE HOUSE?".

Now covered in bandages, Tom comes across Chapter XII: "Mice Are Suckers For Dames," and winds up a toy female mouse that repeatedly says, "Come up and see me some time." Jerry, noticing the toy, walks with it. Tom attempts to lure Jerry into a mouse-sized pretend hotel named "Cozy Arms," with the door leading into Tom's open mouth. Jerry ushers the toy mouse into the hotel first, which causes Tom to eat it, shattering his teeth in the process. After inspecting his ruined teeth in a mirror, Tom has finally had enough and brutally tears the book to shreds in a fit of rage while hiccupping, "Come up and see me some time" since the toy's voice box is in his throat.

Having gone mad with revenge, Tom attempts to blow away Jerry with TNT, gunpowder, dynamite, and a massive blockbuster. When Tom ignites a piece of dynamite, it does not start the fuse enough, so he blows on it — too hard — causing the explosives to erupt, killing him. Nothing but Jerry (who survived the explosion), his mousehole and Tom's toupee remain, while Tom, now dead as a spirit, is seen on a cloud floating to Heaven, still hiccupping, "Come up and see me some time."

Voice cast

Harry E. Lang and William Hanna ... Tom
Sara Berner ... the mouse toy
William Hanna ... Jerry

Production

Directed by: William Hanna, Joseph Barbera
Story: William Hanna, Joseph Barbera
Animation: Ray Patterson, Irven Spence, Kenneth Muse, Pete Burness
Assistant Animation: Barney Posner
Layouts: Harvey Eisenberg
Music: Scott Bradley
Co-Producer: William Hanna
Produced by: Fred Quimby

Availability
DVD
Tom and Jerry's Greatest Chases, Vol. 2 (1995 Turner dubbed version)
Tom and Jerry Spotlight Collection Vol. 1, Disc One (1995 Turner dubbed version)
Tom and Jerry Golden Collection Volume One, Disc One (restored)
Warner Bros. Home Entertainment Academy Awards Animation Collection: 15 Winners (restored)

References

External links

1944 films
1944 short films
1944 animated films
1940s American animated films
1940s animated short films
1944 comedy films
Best Animated Short Academy Award winners
Short films directed by Joseph Barbera
Short films directed by William Hanna
Tom and Jerry short films
Films scored by Scott Bradley
Metro-Goldwyn-Mayer animated short films
Films produced by Fred Quimby
Films about books
Metro-Goldwyn-Mayer cartoon studio short films
1940s English-language films